Solamente Julia is a Chilean telenovela produced and broadcast by TVN.

Cast
 Susana Hidalgo as Julia Sepúlveda
 Felipe Braun as Emilio Ibáñez
 Ignacia Baeza as Ángela García
 Patricio Achurra as Gerardo García
 Cecilia Cucurella as Beatriz Larraín - Main villain
 Andrea Velasco as Isabel Larraín
 Santiago Tupper as Max Carvajal
 Tatiana Molina as Amelia Rojas - Villain
 Marcelo Valdivieso as Pedro Castillo
 Óscar Hernández as Manuel Muñoz
 Carolina Arredondo as Fernanda Salgado
 Ignacio Achurra as Marco Muñoz
 Jorge Velasco as Camilo Sepúlveda
 Andreína Chataing as Idannia Reyes
 Piero Macchiavello as Simón Ibáñez

See also
 Televisión Nacional de Chile

References

External links
 TVN's official website

2013 telenovelas
2013 Chilean television series debuts
2013 Chilean television series endings
Chilean telenovelas
Spanish-language telenovelas
Televisión Nacional de Chile telenovelas